Polikandy is a town  located in Jaffna District, Northern Province, Sri Lanka, governed by an Urban Council. Cities, towns. Places near Polikandy include Point Pedro (which is an extreme point of Sri Lanka), Valvettithurai, Karanavai and Karanavai North. Polikandy has three divisions: Polikandy East, Polikandy West and Polikandy South.

This legendary town is well known for being the birthplace of Thillaiyambalam Sivanesan Soosai, the Chief Commander of the Sea Tigers of the Liberation Tigers of Tamil Eelam or the Sea Tigers, a Tamil nationalist militant group that waged a war for independence in the North and East of Sri Lanka. This town is also the place of birth of the leaders of the Liberation Tigers of Tamil Eelam, Lieutenant Colonel David,  Castro (Manivannan) and Kadaapi (Athavan). Polikandy was the first town to introduce the Sea Tigers. 

This town of the Northern Province has seen many battles between the Sri Lankan Army vs. LTTE during the early 1990 till 2005, especially during the 1990s for a short period of time under the control of LTTE however under government control since 2005 where the Sri Lankan Army recaptured it from the LTTE.

Polikandy  has various temples for gods of the Hindu pantheon, especially the one for the Murugan/ Kanthavanam temple, Sri Pathira Kaali Amman temple, Ilupai Mulai Pillayaar Temple, and Polikandy west Kulathady Vairavar/Bhairava temple. These are the four largest compared to the smaller temples in the vicinity. Most of the temples have a rich history of at least a century.

During the civil war, between 1990 to 1995, people from the Valikamam North area — including Palaly, Kankesanthurai, Myliddy, Tellippalai and Keerimalai have internally displaced to the shores of Polikandy whose livelihood was fishing.

Schools include the Polikandy Hindu Tamil Mixed School and American Mission Tamil Mixed School.

Primary industry is agriculture / farming and fishing.

See also
 Jaffna Peninsula
 Extreme points of Sri Lanka

References

External links
 Phillipus Baldeus - A Dutch Missionary and Author
 The Civil Wars of Sri Lanka during 13th to 15th Century
 Wars waged for the Possession of the Tooth Relic
 A Brief History of Jaffna Kingdom
 The Vallipuram Buddha Image
 Puttalai Maha Vidyalayam Old Students' Association (UK)

Port cities and towns in Sri Lanka
Towns in Jaffna District
Vadamarachchi North DS Division